Survivor: Edge of Extinction is the 38th season of the American CBS competitive reality television series Survivor. The season featured fourteen new contestants competing with four returning players. The season premiered on February 20, 2019 and concluded on May 15, 2019. Chris Underwood was named the winner of the series defeating Gavin Whitson and Julie Rosenberg by a vote of 9–4–0. Underwood was the first person to win Survivor after being voted out in the same season. It was the twelfth season to feature returning players and the seventh to be filmed in Fiji.

Production
This season introduced a new feature wherein contestants who are voted out have an option to take a boat to the titular "Edge of Extinction" rather than leave the game permanently. The Edge of Extinction is a desolate, abandoned beach with even fewer amenities than the main island: contestants on the Edge of Extinction may either wait for an opportunity to re-join the main game or may choose to leave the game at any point by raising a white sail. Castaways on the Edge of Extinction were given regular correspondence by way of coded maps and letters, which led to the location of daily rice rations and advantages in the game. The remaining contestants were initially unaware of this twist; it was officially revealed at the tribal merge, at which point the remaining Edge of Extinction castaways competed in a challenge with the winner returning to the game. The losing castaways were given the opportunity to remain on the Edge of Extinction and, from that point on, all remaining Edge of Extinction inhabitants went to each Tribal Council as members of the jury. This is the most recent season to have the winner reveal and the reunion special taking place live.

Host Jeff Probst explained that the "Edge of Extinction" concept was the result of a goal to "try to get a little deeper psychologically, a little deeper spiritually," asking contestants, "is there a possibility of the spiritual death and rebirth that you seek in life, where you realize something deeper about yourself?"

Casting
This season featured 14 new players and four returning players, the first season since Survivor: Blood vs. Water (11 seasons prior) to feature a mix of both new and returning players. According to host Jeff Probst, the decision to bring back returning players was made as a response to the Edge of Extinction concept to illustrate the difficulties of the game, stating, "Once we landed on Extinction, what stood out to me is we're asking people to go further than they've ever gone before in a game that's already very difficult. Let's bring reminders of how difficult it is. We're going to bring four returning players that are going to remind you."

As such, producers ultimately cast four returning players for this season: Joe Anglim from Worlds Apart and Cambodia, Aubry Bracco from Kaôh Rōng and Game Changers, Kelley Wentworth from San Juan del Sur and Cambodia, and David Wright from Millennials vs. Gen X. Benjamin “Coach” Wade from Tocantins, Heroes vs. Villains, and South Pacific was also asked back by producers but ultimately turned down the offer, saying he felt it was a waste to play on a season with newbies.

Contestants
Among the 14 new players were educator Ron Clark.

{|class="wikitable sortable" style="margin:auto; text-align:center"
|+List of Survivor: Edge of Extinction contestants
! rowspan="2" scope="col" | Contestant
! rowspan="2" scope="col" | Age
! rowspan="2" scope="col" class=unsortable| From
! colspan="3" scope="colgroup" | Tribe
! colspan="2" scope="colgroup" | Main game
! colspan="2" scope="col" class="unsortable" | Edge of Extinction
|-
! scope="col" | Original
! scope="col" | Switched
! scope="col" class=unsortable| Merged
! scope="col" class=unsortable| Finish
! scope="col" class=unsortable| Day
! scope="col" class=unsortable| Finish
! scope="col" class=unsortable| Day
|-
! scope="row" style="text-align:left" |  
|46
|Ashburn,Virginia
| rowspan="4" 
| rowspan="3" bgcolor="darkgrey" |
| rowspan="6" bgcolor="darkgrey" |
|1st voted out1st jury member
|Day 3
|Lost challenge
|
|-
! scope="row" style="text-align:left" | 
|19
|Durham,
|2nd voted out
|Day 6
|Left game
|Day 17
|-
! colspan="3" scope="row" style="text-align:left;font-weight:normal" | (Returned to game)
|3rd voted outRemoved from jury
|Day 8
| 2nd returnee
|Day 35
|-
! colspan="3" scope="row" style="text-align:left;font-weight:normal" | (Returned to game)
|
|4th voted out
|Day 11
| 1st returnee
|Day 17
|-
! scope="row" style="text-align:left;font-weight:normal" | 
|32
|Los Angeles,California
|
| rowspan="2" 
|5th voted out
|Day 13
|Lost challenge
|Day 35
|-
! scope="row" style="text-align:left" |  
|25
|Bell,California
|
|6th voted out
|Day 16
|Left gameby raising sail
|Day 17
|-
! scope="row" style="text-align:left;font-weight:normal" | Worlds Apart & Cambodia
|29
|Ogden,Utah
| rowspan="3" 
|
| rowspan="14" 
|7th voted out3rd jury member
|Day 19
| rowspan="8" |Lost challenge
| rowspan="8" |Day 35
|-
! scope="row" style="text-align:left" |  
|34
|Livermore,California
|
|8th voted out4th jury member
|Day 22
|-
! scope="row" style="text-align:left" |  
|25
|Bethesda,Maryland
|
|9th voted out5th jury member
|Day 23
|-
! scope="row" style="text-align:left;font-weight:normal" | Millennials vs. Gen X
|44
|,California
| rowspan="3" 
| rowspan="3" 
|10th voted out6th jury member
|Day 25
|-
! scope="row" style="text-align:left;font-weight:normal" | San Juan del Sur & Cambodia
|32
|Seattle,Washington
|11th voted out7th jury member
|Day 27
|-
! scope="row" style="text-align:left" | 
|38
|Los Angeles,California
|12th voted out8th jury member
|Day 29
|-
! scope="row" style="text-align:left" |  
|45
|Atlanta,Georgia
| rowspan="3" 
| rowspan="2" 
|13th voted out9th jury member
|Day 31
|-
! scope="row" style="text-align:left" |  
|32
|Orlando,Florida
|14th voted out10th jury member
|
|-
! scope="row" style="text-align:left" |  
|23
|Bronx,New York
|
|15th voted out11th jury member
|Day 36
| colspan="2" rowspan="6" bgcolor="darkgray" |
|-
! scope="row" style="text-align:left" |  
|21
|Waco,Texas
| rowspan="2" 
| rowspan="2" 
|16th voted out12th jury member
|Day 37
|-
! scope="row" style="text-align:left" |  
|33
|Macon,Georgia
|Eliminated13th jury member
|Day 38
|-
! scope="row" style="text-align:left" |  
|46
|New York,New York
| rowspan="2" 
|
|2nd runner-up
| rowspan="3" |Day 39
|-
! scope="row" style="text-align:left" |  
|23
|Erwin,Tennessee
|
|Runner-up
|-
! scope="row" style="text-align:left" | '|25
| Greenville,South Carolina
|
|
|Sole Survivor
|}

Season summary
The 14 new players and four returning players were divided into two tribes of nine: Kama and Manu. At Kama, the new players aligned against returnees Aubry and Joe but avoided Tribal Council, while at Manu, returnees David and Kelley struck up an uneasy truce to control early votes, aided by their respective closest allies, Rick and Lauren. After the tribe swap, Aubry was voted out, while Kelley turned on David to eliminate Rick. Players who were voted out were given a chance to head to a secluded island, the Edge of Extinction, for a chance to return to the game; at the merge, Rick won a competition and rejoined the game.

After the merge, the Kama majority alliance voted out Joe before turning on each other, leading to a series of short-term coalitions to eliminate common threats, including David and Kelley. Rick emerged as the biggest remaining target, but stayed in the game after winning immunity challenges and playing hidden immunity idols. Wardog was the strategic force of the old Manu alliance, while Ron was the strategic force of the old Kama alliance, which caused both to get blindsided by an emerging four-person alliance of Lauren, Victoria, Aurora, and Gavin. However, Lauren then led the charge to blindside Aurora, and then Victoria, both for being big threats to win.   

When five players remained, Chris, who had been on the Edge of Extinction since Day 8, won the final re-entry challenge and returned to the game. Chris convinced Lauren to play her hidden immunity idol on him, successfully played an idol on himself and won the final immunity challenge to earn a spot at the final Tribal Council, only to give up his immunity so he could face Rick in the fire-making challenge; Chris defeated Rick to join Julie and Gavin at the Final Tribal Council. 

At the Final Tribal Council, Julie was largely ignored due to playing with her emotions, and not strategy. She explained her case saying she had tight bonds with Ron and others and said she was the reason why Julia was sent home. Gavin was praised for his social game, effective use of the Extra Vote, and his immunity wins, but playing a relatively safe strategic game, with no big moves. Chris said that even though he was only in the game for 13 days, he made big moves by opting to go into the fire-making challenge, use of multiple idols, and making great social bonds with the people on Edge of Extinction. Because of this, Chris won in a 9-4-0 vote over Gavin and Julie.

Episodes
 

Voting history

Notes

ReceptionSurvivor: Edge of Extinction received negative reviews due to the poorly balanced editing, the Edge of Extinction twist, and the abundance of idols and advantages at the end of the season that helped contribute to the controversial outcome in Chris Underwood, who was voted out on Day 8 and didn't return to the game until Day 35, being crowned the champion of the season. While Underwood was praised for his gameplay in the final few days of the game, his win was controversial due to his early elimination, resulting in him not being involved in the elimination of the majority of the players due to his position on the Edge of Extinction. Survivor blogger and former contestant Stephen Fishbach spoke negatively about the season, stating about Underwood's victory, "On paper, it seems impossible, even insulting. The signature challenge of Survivor is, how do you vote people out of the game in such a way that they're willing to vote for you to win. Chris didn't have to do any of that. Rather than having to betray his tribemates, Chris spent a month feeding them, healing wounds and building bonds. And what does that mean about the past 10 episodes of the show? Were they all just a pointless waiting room for Chris' march to victory?" Fishbach also panned the editing at the conclusion of the season, as many of the cast members received less screen time than the four returning players, Devens, and at the finale, Underwood.

Dalton Ross of Entertainment Weekly also criticized the season's editing and casting, as well as the eventual winner. According to Ross, "Rick Devens was the only true breakout from the cast...but that may also be because so much of the attention early was spent on the four returning players." Ross spoke of Chris' victory, "It's so hard to know what to make of Chris as a winner. He was voted out, only played 13 out of 39 days, and had what other players said was a 'monumental' advantage of getting to become friends with the entire jury in a non-game setting...doesn't really seem fair." Ross ranked the season 29th out of 38 (at the time); as of the conclusion of the 40th season, it is now ranked 30th out of 40.

Leigh Oleszczak of Surviving Tribal wrote, "There was a lot wrong with Survivor: Edge of Extinction... They tried it once and it gave us not only one of the worst seasons ever but the worst winner ever." Andy Dehnart of Reality Blurred also panned the season and its finale, stating, "If you want a shoddily produced game with no coherent rules, just lots of signs that the producers are twisting the game into shapes because they don't understand or care about game design, there are plenty of other options. One of them starts next month on CBS and is called Big Brother." Daniel George of Surviving Tribal also lambasted the Edge of Extinction twist, giving seven reasons why it was a failure in his review of the season. However, the twist would later be used again two seasons and a year later, where it received high praise for the returning contestant despite criticizing it for the return.

In 2020, Survivor fan site "Purple Rock Podcast" ranked this season 26th out of 40 saying that the "gimmick employed here always seemed destined for failure." Later that same year, Inside Survivor ranked this season 33rd out of 40 saying that the Edge of Extinction twist "ultimately makes the whole season feel empty and pointless."

In 2021, Rob Has a Podcast ranked Edge of Extinction 36th out of 40 during their Survivor All-Time Top 40 Rankings podcast. Despite the highly negative responses to the season, Survivor'' once again led the country in the key 18-49 demographic and second overall in viewers during its timeslot.

References

External links
 Official CBS Survivor Website

38
2019 American television seasons
2018 in Fiji
Television shows filmed in Fiji
Television shows set in Fiji